Boarman is a surname and given name. Notable people with the name include:

Surname:
Alexander Boarman (1839–1916), United States federal judge in Louisiana
Andy Boarman (1911–1999), American bluegrass and folk musician
Bryce Boarman (born 1990), American Paralympic soccer player
Charles Boarman (1795–1879), career officer in the United States Navy
Charles Boarman (pioneer) (1828–1880), American pioneer and frontier physician
Gerald Boarman, North Carolina School of Science and Mathematics
James Boarman, Alcatraz escape attempter
William J. Boarman (born 1946), the 26th Public Printer of the United States

Given name:
Charles Boarman Harris (1857–1942), American physician and surgeon
Vira Boarman Whitehouse (1875–1957), owner of the Whitehouse Leather Company, suffragette and early proponent of birth control

See also
Bohrmann
Boorman
Boreman
Borman
Bormann
Bourman

de:Boarman